ET-lehti is a Finnish language general interest magazine targeting senior people and is published in Tampere, Finland. The abbreviation, ET, stands for the Finnish word, EläkeTieto (Retirement Information in English). The magazine has also a Swedish edition.

History and profile
ET-lehti was established in 1973 and was originally started as a magazine for retired people. The magazine is part of Sanoma and published by Sanoma Magazines. Sanoma acquired the magazine in 1983. It was published 18 times a year. Later it began to be published 20 times per year. The magazine targets senior people and is most read by women older than 50 years. The most commonly included topics are about wellbeing, health, beauty, travel and finance. The headquarters of the magazine is in Tampere. The Swedish edition of the magazine was launched by Sanoma.

Kaisa Larmela is one of the former editors-in-chief who was appointed to the post in 1989. On 15 February 2012 Riitta Korhonen became the editor-in-chief. She succeeded Maija Toppila who was appointed to the post on 1 April 2008.

Circulation
ET-lehti had a circulation of 259,291 copies in 2007, making it the second best selling magazine in Finland. Its circulation fell to 254,000 copies in 2009 and to 237,265 copies in 2010. The magazine had a circulation of 232,260 copies in 2011. In 2012 it was the fifth best-selling Finnish magazine with a circulation of 226,853 copies. Its circulation was 202,259 copies in 2013, making it the best-selling title in the Nordic countries.

See also
 List of magazines in Finland

References

External links
 Official website

1973 establishments in Finland
Finnish-language magazines
Lifestyle magazines
Magazines established in 1973
Magazines published in Finland
Mass media in Tampere